Kurara FM is a South African community radio station based in the Northern Cape.

Coverage Areas & Frequencies 
Kuruman and the borders of North West reaching 180 Villages

Broadcast Languages
Setswana (50%)
English (30%)
Afrikaans (20%)

Broadcast Time
24/7

Target Audience
LSM Groups 1 – 8
Kids (20%), Adults (30%), Youth (50%)

Programme Format
70% Music
30% Talk

Listenership Figures

References

External links
SAARF Website
Sentech Website

Community radio stations in South Africa
Mass media in the Northern Cape